Agrupación Deportiva Unión Adarve is a Spanish football team, from the Barrio del Pilar district of Fuencarral-El Pardo, in the city of Madrid, Community of Madrid. It was founded in 1961.

History 
Unión Adarve was the result of a merger of two teams from Barrio del Pilar,  ADC Adarve and Unión Barrio del Pilar (which was then refounded in 1983 in the place of AD Racing del Pilar). After several seasons in the Regional divisions, the club promoted to Tercera División in 2007 by finishing in the third position of the 2006–07 Regional Preferente. In 2008 there was a change in the Board of Directors, José Ferreiro Feijó became the club's new president. With him Unión Adarve returned to Tercera División in 2011.

In 2013, Unión Adarve qualified for the first time to the promotion playoffs, but was eliminated by CD Tropezón in the second round. After several other attempts, promotion was finally gained in 2017 with an away goals victory after a 4–4 draw with Atlético Malagueño.

In the club's first Segunda División B campaign, they also competed for the first time in the Copa del Rey, where they defeated neighbours CF Rayo Majadahonda 1–0 away in the first round on 30 August. In the next round away to UD Logroñés a week later, they lost 8–7 on penalties after a goalless draw. And in the league the club managed to finish in the 11th position. In May, 2019 the club appointed Javi Vázquez as head coach.

Season to season

Unión Barrio del Pilar

ADC Adarve

AD Unión Adarve

2 seasons in Segunda División B
1 season in Segunda División RFEF
9 seasons in Tercera División

Current squad

Stadiums 
 Vereda de Ganapanes
 Vicente del Bosque
 Campo García de la Mata (since 2018–19 season)

References

External links
Official website 
Futbolme team profile 
AD Unión Adarve Barrio del Pilar on Futmadrid.com 
Federación de Fútbol de Madrid 
Club & stadium history Estadios de España 

Football clubs in Madrid
Association football clubs established in 1961
1961 establishments in Spain
Fuencarral-El Pardo